Cocks IBE scheme is an identity based encryption system proposed by Clifford Cocks in 2001. The security of the scheme is based on the hardness of the quadratic residuosity problem.

Protocol

Setup
The PKG chooses:
 a public RSA-modulus , where  are prime and kept secret,
 the message and the cipher space  and
 a secure public hash function .

Extract
When user  wants to obtain his private key, he contacts the PKG through a secure channel. The PKG
 transmits  to the user.

Encrypt
 sends  to the user.

Decrypt
To decrypt a ciphertext  for user , he
 computes  if  or  otherwise, and
 computes .

In this case we have to send a ciphertext for both cases. As soon as this information is known to the encrypting entity, only one element needs to be sent.

Correctness

 

Moreover, (for the case that  is a quadratic residue, same idea holds for ):

Security
It can be shown that breaking the scheme is equivalent to solving the quadratic residuosity problem, which is suspected to be very hard.

Problems
A major disadvantage of this scheme is that it can encrypt messages only bit per bit - therefore, it is only suitable for small data packets like a session key. To illustrate, consider a 128 bit key that is transmitted using a 1024 bit modulus. Then, one has to send 2 × 128 × 1024 bit = 32 KByte (when it is not known whether  is the square of a or −a), which is only acceptable for environments in which session keys change infrequently.

This scheme does not preserve key-privacy, i.e. a passive adversary can recover meaningful information about the identity of the recipient observing the ciphertext.

References

Identity-based cryptography